Bushehr Provincial League is the premier football league of Bushehr Province and is 5th in the Iranian football pyramid after the 3rd Division.It is part of the Vision Asia program.

References

Sport in Bushehr Province
5